WZZP (97.5 FM "Z97.5") is a mainstream rock radio station that serves Clarksville, Tennessee, Hopkinsville, Kentucky, and Fort Campbell, Kentucky. Owned by the Five Star Media Group subsidiary of Saga Communications, it debuted with a classic hits format in 2000, switching to the active rock format in 2003.  WZZP operates at 3,000 watts from an antenna located in Hopkinsville.

Saga Communications also operates WVVR 100.3 Country, WRND 94.3 Classic Hits, WCVQ 107.9 Adult Contemporary, and WKFN 540 AM Sports as a cluster from its main offices in Clarksville.

Southern Broadcasting, Inc., with its President Thomas T. Cassetty applied to the FCC for a construction permit to build WZZP FM on November 9, 1999. According to FCC records, the station began as WTNK-FM which stood for "Tennessee aNd Kentucky" on June 29, 2000.  The station changed calls to the present day WZZP-FM on October 20, 2000. Saga Communications, purchased the station from Southern Broadcasting, Inc.

History
The station went on the air as WTNK on June 29, 2000.  On October 20, 2000, the station changed its call sign to the current WZZP.

The call sign WZZP has been previously used. From March 21, 1977, to March 5, 1984, WZZP, with branding "Zip 106", was applied to what became WHLK in the Cleveland, Ohio market. From November 12, 1984, to September 2, 1991, WZZP was applied to what became WRBR-FM in the South Bend, Indiana market.

See also
 KAZR "103.3 Everything That Rocks", Saga's Des Moines, Iowa station of the same format.
 WLZX-FM 99.3 "Everything That Rocks", Saga's Northampton, Massachusetts station of the same format.

References

External links

ZZP
Radio stations established in 1984